Ali Boumendjel (May 24, 1919 – March 23, 1957) was an Algerian revolutionary and lawyer.

Biography 

Born in Relizane to an educated family from Beni Yeni region, Boumendjel was educated at the Duveyrier college in Blida, where he met with other future figures of the Algerian revolution, such as Abane Ramdane, Benyoucef Benkhedda and Saad Dahlab. He then oriented his career toward law, and became a journalist for the Egalité journal, controlled by the integrationists of Ferhat Abbas. During the revolution he became, with Jacques Verges, one of many lawyers working for the Algerian nationalists. In 1955, he joined the National Liberation Front (FLN) with his old friend Abane Ramdane, after Ramdane was released from prison. Ramdane advised Boumendjel to change his professional orientation, so he joined the litigation department of Shell corporation, while still continuing his militantism in the FLN.

Ali studied law and became a lawyer. His political awakening took place during the days of the Popular Front. It was marked by the call for the emancipation of the Algerian Nation launched by Messali Hadj and sensitive to the commitment and communist mobilization in the Muslim Congress. He refused military service in the French Army, which earned him a list of anti-French activities and to be considered a dangerous nationalist.

Boumendjel was arrested on February 9, 1957, and underwent over a month of torture at the hands of commandant Paul Aussaresses and his men. On March 23, in El Biar, outside Algiers, he was thrown from the sixth floor of a building; his death was passed off as a suicide. Forty-three years later, in 2000, Aussaresses admitted that Boumendjel had been murdered.

Following the recommendations of the report by historian Benjamin Stora on remembrance of  French Algeria, on March 2, 2021, French President Emmanuel Macron recognized that Ali Boumendjel was "tortured and murdered" by the French army.  The president received four of Ali Boumendjel's grandchildren to announce to them the recognition, on behalf of France, of his assassination. The press release evokes the confession of Paul Aussaresses to have ordered one of his subordinates to disguise the murder as suicide.

Tributes 
A street and a metro station bear his name in Algiers as well as a city in Relizane, his birthplace.

References

Bibliography 

1919 births
1957 deaths
Members of the National Liberation Front (Algeria)
Assassinated Algerian politicians
20th-century Algerian lawyers
People of the Algerian War
20th-century Algerian politicians